Miss London Ltd. is a 1943 British, black-and-white, comedy, musical, war film, directed by Val Guest and starring Arthur Askey and Evelyn Dall. It was produced by Edward Black, Maurice Ostrer, Fred Gunn and Gainsborough Pictures.

Plot 
This musical comedy playing in wartime London, stars Arthur Askey as Arthur Boden alias Miss London, the name of the escort agency he inherited from his mother. Soon he is joined by his new American partner, Terry Arden  (Evelyn Dall), as she inherited the other half of the Agency from her parents, who just arrived from abroad. The first thing she accomplishes is to clean up the office, together with her partner.
Then they have to renew the files of escort-Ladies. In order to do so, each of them goes searching in different places. Arthur Boden is assigned to the railway station and finally he finds railway clerk Gail Martin (Anne Shelton) to hire. The opening sequence of the film features the latter singing "The 8.50 Choo Choo For Waterloo Choo" at Waterloo station before she is recruited by Bowman for his agency. As usual, Ronald Shiner's character of Sailor Meredith plays a decisive role.

The film features a surreal self-parodying sequence in which Boden, in order to gain entrance to a hotel, pretends to be the famous Arthur Askey, using some of his choice catchphrases. Other spoofs include Askey and Dall doing a routine as Fred Astaire and Ginger Rogers and, with Shiner in addition, as the three Marx Brothers.

Cast 
 Arthur Askey as Arthur Boden
 Evelyn Dall as Terry Arden
 Anne Shelton as Gail Martin
 Richard Hearne as Commodore Joshua Wellington
 Max Bacon as Romero
 Jack Train as Joe Nelson
 Peter Graves as Captain Michael "Rory" O'More
 Jean Kent as The Encyclopedia Girl
 Ronald Shiner as Sailor Meredith
 Iris Lang
 Virginia Keiley
 Una Shepherd
 Sheila Bligh
 Noni Brooke
 Patricia Owens as Miss London
 Hilda Campbell Russell as Cabaret Singer

Soundtrack 
Evelyn Dall and Anne Shelton – "A Fine How Do You Do" (Words and music by Val Guest and Manning Sherwin)
Evelyn Dall – "Keep Cool Calm and Collected" (Words and music by Val Guest and Manning Sherwin)
Arthur Askey – "The Moth" (Words and music by Val Guest and Manning Sherwin)
Arthur Askey – "I'm Only Me" (Words and music by Val Guest and Manning Sherwin)
Anne Shelton – "You Too Can Have a Lovely Romance" (Words and music by Val Guest and Manning Sherwin)
Anne Shelton – "The 8.50 Choo Choo" (Words and music by Val Guest and Manning Sherwin)
Anne Shelton – "If You Could Only Cook" (Words and music by Val Guest and Manning Sherwin)
 "My Father Was a Yes Man" (Words and music by Val Guest and Manning Sherwin)

References

External links
 
 

1943 films
1943 musical comedy films
1940s war comedy films
British black-and-white films
British musical comedy films
British war comedy films
British World War II propaganda films
1940s English-language films
Films directed by Val Guest
Films produced by Maurice Ostrer
Films set in London
Gainsborough Pictures films
Films with screenplays by Marriott Edgar
1943 directorial debut films